A list of the 19 municipalities (comuni) of the Province of Livorno, Tuscany, Italy.

List

See also 
List of municipalities of Italy

References

See also

 01
Livorno